Radoslav Kráľ (born 18 February 1974) is a Slovak footballer. He competed in the men's tournament at the 2000 Summer Olympics.

References

External links
 

1974 births
Living people
Slovak footballers
Olympic footballers of Slovakia
Footballers at the 2000 Summer Olympics
Sportspeople from Žilina
Association football defenders
MŠK Žilina players
FC VSS Košice players
Zalaegerszegi TE players
MFK Ružomberok players
FK Viktoria Žižkov players
Polonia Bytom players
Slovak expatriate footballers
Expatriate footballers in Hungary
Expatriate footballers in the Czech Republic
Expatriate footballers in Poland